Stanley Henry Hayhurst (13 May 1925 – 1998) was an English professional footballer who played as a goalkeeper.

References

1925 births
1998 deaths
People from Leyland, Lancashire
English footballers
Association football goalkeepers
Leyland Motors F.C. players
Blackburn Rovers F.C. players
Tottenham Hotspur F.C. players
Barrow A.F.C. players
Grimsby Town F.C. players
Weymouth F.C. players
English Football League players